Birulia is a genus of shrimp. It is one of a group of genera that are usually treated as part of the family Hippolytidae, but have also been separated off as the family Thoridae.

References

External links

Alpheoidea